Miguel Ángel Rodríguez Forero (born December 20, 1985 in Bogotá), known as Miguel Rodríguez, is a professional male squash player who represents Colombia. He reached a career-high world ranking of World No. 4 in June 2015.

Early life

Rodríguez was born in Bogotá, Colombia. He was introduced to squash at the age of 2 by his father Ángel, a former professional squash player himself. He played primarily at the Club El Nogal in Bógota. Miguel attended the school Calasanz, where he also played football and table tennis. His most significant achievement as a junior is winning the US Junior Open and the Canadian Junior Open in Boys' Under 19 for 2 years in a row in 2003 and 2004. Rodríguez then started his professional squash career, and saw his first PSA World Tour title in November 2005 at the age of 19.

Career overview
Rodríguez won the Colombian Open twice, in 2008 and 2010, and was runner-up in 2006 and 2012.
Rodriguez won the Pan American Games in 2015

In September, he became the highest-ranked South American of all-time, exceeding then Federico Usandizaga of Argentina.

In 2013, he won the Bluenose Classic in Halifax in Canada in March and was bronze medalist of the World Games in Cali. He also won gold at the 2015 pan-am games in Toronto for single mens.

On May 20, 2018, he won the 2018 British Open Squash Championships in Hull, England, beating Egypt's Mohamed El Shorbagy in a 5 game thriller to become the first-ever man from Colombia, and more broadly South America, to win the coveted British Open title.
Rodríguez is known to wear different colored shoes when on court.

Major World Series final appearances

British Open: 1 final (1 title, 0 runner-up)

References

External links 
 
 
 

1985 births
Living people
Sportspeople from Bogotá
Colombian male squash players
Pan American Games medalists in squash
Pan American Games gold medalists for Colombia
Pan American Games bronze medalists for Colombia
Squash players at the 2007 Pan American Games
Squash players at the 2011 Pan American Games
Squash players at the 2015 Pan American Games
World Games bronze medalists
Competitors at the 2013 World Games
Competitors at the 2017 World Games
Competitors at the 2022 World Games
South American Games gold medalists for Colombia
South American Games medalists in squash
Competitors at the 2010 South American Games
Squash players at the 2019 Pan American Games
Medalists at the 2011 Pan American Games
Medalists at the 2015 Pan American Games
Medalists at the 2019 Pan American Games
Pan American Games silver medalists for Colombia
21st-century Colombian people